David Gwerfyl Davies (1 February 1913 – 1977) was a Welsh organist and composer.

Background
He was born on 1 February 1913. He was a pupil at Merthyr Tydfil County Grammar School and then University College, Cardiff. He was awarded his BA in music in 1937. After the Second World War he took the degree of Mus.B. at Trinity College, Cambridge and graduated in 1954.

Appointments
Organist at St Nicolas' Church, Kings Norton 1950 - 1953
Organist at Brecon Cathedral 1956 – 1963

Compositions
He composed church and organ music.

References

1913 births
1977 deaths
Welsh classical organists
British male organists
Welsh classical composers
Welsh male classical composers
Cathedral organists
Alumni of Trinity College, Cambridge
People from Merthyr Tydfil
20th-century classical musicians
20th-century British composers
20th-century organists
20th-century British male musicians
Male classical organists